Sumandeep Vidyapeeth is private, deemed university located in Piparia, Waghodia, Vadodara, Gujarat, India. It is accredited "A++" grade by NAAC.

Institutes and departments
 K. M. Shah Dental College and Hospital
 Shrimati B. K. Shah Medical Institute and Research Centre
 College of Physiotherapy
 Sumandeep Nursing College
 Department of Pharmacy
 Department of Management
 Sumandeep Homoeopathic Medical College and Hospital

Controversy
In 2017, the president Mansukh Shah and two other persons were arrested by the  Anti Corruption Bureau (ACB) of Gujarat for allegedly demanding and accepting  20 lakh to let a medical student appear in examination. In raid, the ACB found documents pertaining to fixed deposits worth  44.63 crore, four cars collectively worth  1 crore and 200 bank cheques of  101 crore from home and offices of Shah.

References

Universities and colleges in Gujarat
Vadodara district
Educational institutions established in 2007
2007 establishments in Gujarat
Deemed universities in India